The following lists events that happened during 1991 in the Democratic Republic of São Tomé and Príncipe.

Incumbents
President: Miguel Trovoada (from 3 April)
Prime Minister: Daniel Daio (from 7 February)

Events
20 January: The first legislative election took place
7 February: Daniel Daio becomes Prime Minister of São Tomé and Príncipe
3 March: The first presidential election took place
2 April: Miguel Trovoada becomes the second president of São Tomé and Príncipe
April: the I Constitutional Government of São Tomé and Príncipe began

Sports
Santana FC won the São Tomé and Príncipe Football Championship

References

 
Years of the 20th century in São Tomé and Príncipe
1990s in São Tomé and Príncipe
São Tomé and Príncipe
São Tomé and Príncipe